Fatima (died 1246), was a senior office holder in the Mongol Empire of the thirteenth century and a favourite of empress Töregene Khatun.

Fatima was originally a Tajik or Persian captive from the Middle Eastern campaign. She was a Shia Muslim who was deported from the Shia shrine of Mashhad to the Mongolian Plateau, where she became the favorite of Töregene Khatun.

In 1241, after the death of Ögedei Khan, power passed to the hands of one of his widows, Möge Khatun, previously one of Genghis Khan's wives. In the spring of 1242, however, Töregene Khatun assumed complete power as regent with the support of Chagatai and her sons with the title Great Khatun and replaced the ministers of Ögödei with her own. Her most important cabinet member was Fatima.
Abd-ur-Rahman was put in charge of general administration in North China, while Fatima came to a very powerful position at the Mongol court. A minister post was very unusual for a woman in the 13th-century.

In 1246, Töregene's son Güyük Khan came to power, and Töregene resigned from regency. Despite her role in ensuring Güyük's election as Khagan, the relationship between Töregene and Güyük was bad. Güyük's brother Koden accused Fatima of using witchcraft to damage his health. When Koden died a few months later, Güyük insisted that his mother hand Fatima over for execution.
Töregene refused and threatened her son Güyük that she would commit suicide to spite him. Despite this, Güyük's men seized Fatima, tortured her, and executed her by sewing up all of her orifices and dumping her into water; Töregene's supporters in the imperial household were simultaneously purged. Within 18 months of Fatima's death, Töregene herself died under still unexplained circumstances.

References

Women of medieval Persia
People executed for witchcraft
People executed by drowning
Women of the Mongol Empire
1246 deaths
Royal favourites
13th-century executions
Mongol Empire Muslims
13th-century Iranian people